Barberyn Lighthouse (also known as Beruwala Lighthouse) is a lighthouse located on Barberyn Island.

The lighthouse was completed in November 1889, and operated by the Imperial Lighthouse Service. In 1969 it was upgraded with the replacement of the old dioptric apparatus (produced by Chance Brothers) and with a pedestal rotating beacon (Pharos Marine PRB-21 sealed beam optic and drive pedestal). It was further modernised in 2000, with the introduction of a Differential Global Positioning System (DGPS) and is computer linked to the other major lighthouses around the country. The Barberyn Lighthouse is one of the four international lighthouses in Sri Lanka.

See also

 List of lighthouses in Sri Lanka

References

External links

 Sri Lanka Ports Authority 
 Lighthouses of Sri Lanka

Buildings and structures in Kalutara District
Lighthouses in Sri Lanka
Lighthouses completed in 1889
Archaeological protected monuments in Kalutara District